Ottokar II may refer to:

 Ottokar II, Margrave of Styria (died 1122)
 Ottokar II of Bohemia (c. 1230–1278), called The Iron and Golden King